Nick John Forkovitch (March 1, 1919 – April 5, 1998) was a professional American football player for the All-America Football Conference's Brooklyn Dodgers. He played in 9 games in the 1948 season after his collegiate career at William & Mary. He had one rush for 4 yards. His head coach for the Dodgers was Carl M. Voyles, who was his head coach at William & Mary in 1942.

References

1919 births
1998 deaths
Brooklyn Dodgers (AAFC) players
People from Harrisonburg, Virginia
Sportspeople from McKeesport, Pennsylvania
Players of American football from Pennsylvania
William & Mary Tribe football players